Sirocco is an Australian music group that began in 1980 with three musicians: Bill O'Toole, Guy Madigan and Andrew de Teliga. In 1981 Michael Atherton joined and the group recorded their first album Paths of the Wind.

They have been nominated for the ARIA Award for Best Indigenous Release in 1987 (Voyage), for Best Independent Release in 1990 (Port of Call) and for Best World Music Album three times, 1995 (The Wetland Suite), 1996 (Stars and Fires) and 1999 (Falling Leaf).

The concept of the band was to find inspiration from the numerous cultures in Australia. When Sirocco started, the music scene in Australia was classical, rock, jazz and a little folk. However, the numerous migrant cultures, such as Chilean, Turkish, Arabic and Irish, had a vibrant music culture. Sirocco tapped into this and brought many of these expert musicians into the band for guest performances.

The early albums and performances were known for the unusual array of instruments rarely seen outside their community, including the oud, cittern, cabrette, kaval, dumbe, tupan. Their instruments were mixed and matched in the same way as the Australian population. Their performances were wild, always getting the audience up and dancing—"the excitement of rock and roll, the improvisation of jazz and the musicianship of classical". Of interest, they performed at many weddings because there are many intercultural marriages in Australia. The bride and groom came from very different cultures and it was only Sirocco who could perform their music in such an Australian manner.

They are well known for innovation and it was demonstrated in their concert in the endangered Macquarie Marshes in 1993 and the concert with the Dayaks in central Borneo.

Sirocco now have 14 albums released and a video. They have toured over 32 countries including India (four times), Laos, Nepal and Pakistan, and were the first Australian group to tour both Russia and China.

Discography

Albums
{| class="wikitable plainrowheaders" style="text-align:center;"
|-
! rowspan="2" style="width:12em;"| Title
! rowspan="2" style="width:17em;"| Details
! colspan="1"| Peak positions
|- style="font-size:smaller;"
! width="50"| AUS
|-
! scope="row"| Paths of the Wind 
|
 Released: 1982
 Label: Arika Records (AR004)
 Formats: LP
| —
|-
! scope="row"| Earth Dance
|
 Released: 1983
 Label: Arika Records (AR004)
 Formats: LP
| —
|-
! scope="row"| Voyage|
 Released: 1986
 Label: Larrikin Records (LRF 184)
 Formats: LP, Cassette
| —
|-
! scope="row"| Port of Call 
|
 Released: 1989
 Label: Jarra Hill Records (JHR 2009)
 Formats: CD, LP, Cassette
| —
|-
! scope="row"| The Breath of Time|
 Released: 1990
 Label: ABC Records (842738-2)
 Formats: CD, LP
| —
|-
! scope="row"| A Celtic Breeze in the Antipodes|
 Released: 1992
 Label: Jarra Hill (CDJHR 2018)
 Formats: CD
 Compilation of Path of the Wind and Earth Dance| —
|-
! scope="row"| The Evergreen Realm (with Chai Chang Ning)
|
 Released: 1992
 Label: Jarra Hill Records (CDJHR2015)
 Formats: CD
| —
|-
! scope="row"| Australian Voyage - Folk-Rock Symphony|
 Released: 1992
 Label: Arc Music 
 Formats: CD
| —
|-
! scope="row"| Wetland Suite|
 Released: 1993
 Label: ABC Music (4795892)
 Formats: CD
| —
|-
! scope="row"| Stars & Fires|
 Released: 1995
 Label: ABC Music (4798372)
 Formats: CD
| —
|-
! scope="row"| Walkabout the World|
 Released: 1996
 Label: Musica Pangaea (MP 10001)
 Formats: CD
| —
|-
! scope="row"| Zephyr|
 Released: 1996
 Label: ABC Music, EMI (72438544582 8)
 Formats: CD
| —
|-
! scope="row"| Falling Leaf|
 Released: 1998
 Label: ABC Music, EMI (72434945182 7)
 Formats: CD
| —
|-
! scope="row"| Essential Elements - A Collection|
 Released: 2003
 Label: ABC Music (13162)
 Formats: CD
 Note: Compilation
| —
|}

Film/television composer or contributorCharlie's Angels "Belly" original song (2000)Perfume feature film score, directed by Michael Rymer (2001)Undertow Didgeridoo for feature film score by Philip Glass (2004)Revolution TV film score, directed by Michael Rymer (2009)

Awards and nominations
ARIA Music Awards
The ARIA Music Awards is an annual awards ceremony that recognises excellence, innovation, and achievement across all genres of Australian music. They commenced in 1987.

! 
|-
| 1987
| Voyage| ARIA Award for Best World Music Album
| 
| 
|-
| 1990
| Port of Call| ARIA Award for Best Independent Release
| 
| 
|-
| 1995
| The Wetland Suite| ARIA Award for Best World Music Album
| 
| 
|-
| 1996
| Stars and Fires| Best World Music Album
| 
| 
|-
| 1999
| Falling Leaf''
| Best World Music Album
| 
| 
|-

References

External links 
 https://www.siroccomusic.org/

Australian folk music groups